The MultiLevel Coach is a bi-level passenger rail car for use on commuter rail lines. The first units were delivered by Bombardier Transportation in 2006 for New Jersey Transit and Montreal's Exo. Over 643 have been delivered in various orders, including a later purchase by Maryland's MARC. NJ Transit ordered an additional 113 cars in 2021 from Alstom, which purchased Bombardier.

Overview 
There are 643 MultiLevel Coach cars in service as of 2015 on NJ Transit, Montreal's Exo, and Maryland's MARC. NJ Transit received 429 cars, including 62 cab cars. Exo has purchased 160 cars, including 26 cab cars. The MARC order consists of 39 trailers and 15 cab cars for a total of 54 cars.

The coaches were based on the Comet V and have a two-by-two seating arrangement and more knee and leg room than single-level coaches. The seats are also bigger and it has 15-30% more seating than on single-level coaches. The intermediate levels have 5 inward-facing seats on each side which flip up for wheelchairs or bicycles. On cab cars, a large equipment locker behind the cab replaces one row of seats. There are single-width side doors at intermediate levels for high-platform loading, and similar doors outboard of the bogies except at the cab position on cab cars. The latter doors of NJ Transit coaches have stepwell trapdoors, allowing these doors to be used for both high and low-platform loading. Exo coaches have one-piece end doors without traps, which can be used only for low-platform loading. There are also an automated announcement system and LED destination screens.

Eight MultiLevel cars were previously designated for the now-discontinued Atlantic City Express Service. These included the addition of first class seating sections and lounge facilities. After the ACES was discontinued in 2012, the cars were converted to regular NJT cars by Bombardier from 2013 until 2014. They re-entered NJT service in mid-2014.

Service history 
The first order for the coaches was placed in December 2002 by NJ Transit when it purchased 100 cars, with deliveries beginning in 2005. In September 2005, the agency ordered 131 additional cars. After exercising further contract options, the last order of which was placed in August 2008, a total of 329 first-generation cars  were eventually purchased by NJ Transit.

In December 2007, Exo's predecessor, the Agence métropolitaine de transport (AMT) placed an order for 160 cars via a base order for 30 units and options for 130 more, though all options were exercised immediately.  The cars began to enter service in late 2009.

In September 2010, NJ Transit ordered 100 additional coaches, designated MultiLevel II, with options for 79 more. In October 2011, MARC Train ordered 54 cars—15 cab cars and 39 trailing cars—from the NJ Transit options. The remaining 25 options were not exercised.

In December 2018, NJ Transit ordered 113 additional coaches, designated MultiLevel III; the order included 55 unpowered cars and 58 powered multiple units with AC electric propulsion systems, which when coupled to other MultiLevel cars will allow the train to be propelled without a separate electric locomotive.  The contract included options for up to 636 more cars. The new multilevel cars are to replace NJ Transit's Arrow III EMUs. The maximum speed of the power cars is 110 mph. These cars may replace the 29 older ALP-46 electric locomotives in the future. Alstom, which purchased Bombardier in 2021, will complete the order.

Many of the windows have become permanently clouded due to heat and UV exposure which makes them difficult to see out of.

Operators

Gallery

See also 

 Bombardier BiLevel Coach
 SNCF TGV Duplex
 Sydney Trains S set
 Voiture de banlieue à 2 niveaux
 Voiture État à 2 étages

References

External links 

Bombardier MultiLevel Coaches
Specification Sheet; Page 10

Rail passenger cars of the United States
Railway coaches of Canada
Bombardier Transportation rail vehicles
NJ Transit Rail Operations
Exo (public transit)
Train-related introductions in 2006
Double-decker rail vehicles